This is a list of singles which have reached number one on the Irish Singles Chart in 1979.

20 Number Ones
Most weeks at No.1 (song): "Bright Eyes" - Art Garfunkel, "Do You Want Your Oul Lobby Washed Down" - Brendan Shine (5)
Most weeks at No.1 (artist): Art Garfunkel, Brendan Shine (5)
Most No.1s: Abba (2), The Police (2)
Two songs about the visit by Pope John Paul II to Ireland reached No. 1

See also
1979 in music
Irish Singles Chart
List of artists who reached number one in Ireland

1979 in Irish music
1979 record charts
1979